Sidney Mellor Sykes (28 February 1882 – 19 August 1949) was an Australian rules footballer who played with South Melbourne in the Victorian Football League (VFL).

He also played for Victorian Football Association club Prahran, notably kicking 12.5 of his team's total of 12.17 in its match against , at Toorak Park, on 24 August 1907.

Notes

References
 Fiddian, Marc (2004); The VFA; A History of the Victorian Football Association 1877–1995, Melbourne: Marc Fiddian.

External links 

 Sid (sic) Sykes, at The VFA Prolject.

1882 births
1949 deaths
Australian rules footballers from Victoria (Australia)
Australian Rules footballers: place kick exponents
Sydney Swans players
Prahran Football Club players